The 1918–19 Princeton Tigers men's ice hockey season was the 19th season of play for the program.

Season
After the armistice was signed in November, the university began preparing to receive students for the spring semester. The slow return allowed Princeton to restart many of its athletic programs, including the ice hockey team. There was a predictable delay before the team was formed and able to play its first game, but an agreement was reached with Harvard and Yale where each squad would play the other two.

Princeton's first game came against the St. Nicholas Hockey Club with the Tigers taking an early lead. After the opposing captain was injured and was forced to leave the game, Princeton agreed to play the remainder of the contest 6-on-6. The speed of St. Nicholas allowed them to carry the play for the balance of the game and finish with a 6–4 victory over Princeton. After losing a close practice game against the Brooklyn Hockey Club, Princeton was outplayed by Yale in a 1–6 loss.

The final game was a route at the hands of Harvard with the Crimson winning 7–2. Princeton played well in their few games but were hampered by a lack of practice time and experience.

Roster

Standings

Schedule and Results

|-
!colspan=12 style=";" | Regular Season

Scoring Statistics

Note: Assists were not recorded as a statistic.

References

Princeton Tigers men's ice hockey seasons
Princeton
Princeton
Princeton
Princeton